San Donnino Martire is a late-Renaissance style, Roman Catholic parish church located on Via Franchini in the town of Montecchio Emilia, in the Province of Reggio Emilia, region of Emilia-Romagna, Italy.

History
The site had an oratory by the ninth century; at one time, the church was attached to an abbey. In 1233, the church and its diocese were linked to the rule of Parma. In 1596-1600, the church and bell-tower were reconstructed. the church has a nave and two aisles leading to a semicircular apse. The facade has three doorways, and above the central doorway, a niche houses the statue of St Domninus of Fidenza. The bell-tower was only completed in 1948. 

The interior has a chapel of the Holy Sacrament painted in 1903 by Augusto Mussini (Fra' Paolo da Reggio). The main altarpiece is an 18th-century canvas depicting the namesake saint by Jean-Baptiste Le Bel. The wooden choir was carved in the 1800s by Brindani.

References

Churches in the province of Reggio Emilia
16th-century Roman Catholic church buildings in Italy
Roman Catholic churches completed in 1600
Renaissance architecture in Emilia-Romagna
1600 establishments in Italy